Tumisang Monnatlala (born 31 January 1995) is a South African steeplechase runner. He competed in the 3000 metres steeplechase event at the 2015 World Championships in Beijing without qualifying for the final.

Competition record

Personal bests
Outdoor
1500 metres – 3:49.56 (Stellenbosch 2012)
3000 metres – 8:34.1 (Pretoria 2012)
3000 metres steeplechase – 8:33.02 (Stellenbosch 2015)

References

External links

1995 births
Living people
South African male long-distance runners
South African male steeplechase runners
World Athletics Championships athletes for South Africa
Place of birth missing (living people)